Carl Thomas Sheehan (born 8 February 1974) is a New Zealand rowing cox.

Sheehan was born in 1974 in Christchurch, New Zealand. He represented New Zealand at the 1992 Summer Olympics. He is listed as New Zealand Olympian athlete number 670 by the New Zealand Olympic Committee.

References

1974 births
Living people
New Zealand male rowers
Rowers at the 1992 Summer Olympics
Olympic rowers of New Zealand
Rowers from Christchurch
Coxswains (rowing)